William Blackwood Beveridge (December 16, 1835 – April 13, 1890 ) was a merchant and political figure in New Brunswick. He represented Victoria County in the Legislative Assembly of New Brunswick from 1874 to 1882 as a Liberal-Conservative member.

He was born in Perth, Victoria County, New Brunswick, the son of Benjamin Beveridge and Joanna Taylor, and was educated at Mount Allison College. He worked in his father's store, later taking over the business, and also entered the lumber trade with his brother Henry Douglas. In 1862, he married Jane Elizabeth Stevens. Beveridge was postmaster at Andover, also serving as justice of the peace and as major in the local militia. In 1867, he ran unsuccessfully for a seat in the House of Commons. He was a member of the Masonic lodge. In 1882, he was named to the Legislative Council.

References 
The Canadian biographical dictionary and portrait gallery of eminent and self-made men ... (1881)
The Canadian parliamentary companion, 1883 JA Gemmill

1835 births
1890 deaths
New Brunswick Liberal Association MLAs
People from Perth-Andover
Members of the Legislative Council of New Brunswick
Candidates in the 1867 Canadian federal election